The enzyme pantothenoylcysteine decarboxylase catalyzes the chemical reaction

N-[(R)-pantothenoyl]-L-cysteine  pantetheine + CO2

This enzyme belongs to the family of lyases, specifically the carboxy-lyases, which cleave carbon-carbon bonds.  The systematic name of this enzyme class is N-[(R)-pantothenoyl]-L-cysteine carboxy-lyase (pantetheine-forming). Other names in common use include pantothenylcysteine decarboxylase, and N-[(R)-pantothenoyl]-L-cysteine carboxy-lyase.  This enzyme participates in pantothenate and coa biosynthesis.

References 

 

EC 4.1.1
Enzymes of unknown structure